Shahr-e Shib Kalah (also Romanized as Shahr-e Shīb Kalāh; also known as Kalāh) is a village in Gowharan Rural District, Gowharan District, Bashagard County, Hormozgan Province, Iran. At the 2006 census, its population was 82, in 22 families.

References 

Populated places in Bashagard County